Toufik Mouyet (born January 18, 1977 in Sétif) is an Algerian footballer. He currently plays for USM Bel-Abbès in the Algerian Ligue Professionnelle 1 for 2012-2013 season.

External links
 

1977 births
Living people
Algerian footballers
Algerian Ligue Professionnelle 1 players
Footballers from Sétif
USM Bel Abbès players
Association football goalkeepers
21st-century Algerian people